Roger Larivée is a former politician in Montreal, Quebec, Canada. He served on the Montreal city council from 1978 to 1982 as a member of the Civic Party of Montreal.

Larivée worked at his family's roofing firm in private life. He first ran for a seat on city council in the 1974 municipal election and was defeated in the second Saint-Jacques ward. He was elected in the 1978 municipal election, in which the Civic Party won a landslide majority, and served for the next four years as a backbench supporter of mayor Jean Drapeau's administration. He was defeated by Robert Perreault of the Montreal Citizens' Movement in the 1982 election.

Larivée intended to run as a Civic Party candidate again in the 1986 municipal election but was denied the nomination. He later briefly affiliated with the Montreal Municipal Democratic Alliance party, but ultimately chose to run as an independent. He finished a distant third.

Electoral record

References

Living people
Montreal city councillors
Year of birth missing (living people)